Adam Fuller (born 29 December 1990) is a United States Virgin Islands international footballer who plays as a forward.

Career statistics

International

References

External links
 Adam Fuller at CaribbeanFootballDatabase

1990 births
Living people
United States Virgin Islands soccer players
United States Virgin Islands international soccer players
Association football forwards